The politics of Monaco take place within the framework of a constitutional monarchy, with the Prince of Monaco as head of state, with some powers devolved to several advisory and legislative bodies.

Constitution

Historically, the princes of the ruling House of Grimaldi were autocrats of an absolute monarchy until the first Constitution of Monaco was adopted in 1911. A second constitution was granted by Prince Rainier III on December 17, 1962, outlining legislative, judicial, and executive branches of government, which consist of several administrative offices and a number of councils. The Prince as head of state retains most of the country's governing power; however, the principality's judicial and legislative bodies may operate independently of his control.

Government of Monaco

Executive branch

|Sovereign Prince
|Albert II
|
|6 April 2005
|-
|Minister of State
|Pierre Dartout
|
|1 September 2020
|}
The Council of Government is under the authority of the prince. The title and position of prince is hereditary, the minister of state was appointed by the monarch from a list of three French or Monegasque national candidates presented by the French government, but now (since 2002) is chosen by the monarch. Until the 2002 amendment to the Monegasque constitution, only French nationals were eligible for the post. The prince is advised by the Crown Council of Monaco.

Legislative branch

|President
|Stéphane Valeri
|Primo ! Priorité Monaco
|22 February 2018
|}
The unicameral National Council (Conseil National) has 24 seats. The members are elected by popular vote to serve five-year terms. The Council can be disbanded by the Prince of Monaco provided that he hosts elections within 3 months. Uniquely, Monegasque legislators can be members of multiple political parties. Currently the administrative coalition, Monegasque National Union, holds all 24 seats after winning nearly 90% of the vote in the 2023 general election. The coalition consists of the three largest parties in Monaco: Priorité Monaco (centre-right), which won 21 seats in the 2018 general election; Horizon Monaco (right-wing) which won 2 seats in 2018; and Union Monégasque, (centre), which won 1 seat in 2018.  The centre-left coalition, New Ideas for Monaco, holds no seats after running candidates in just 13 seats and winning only 10% of the vote.

Political parties and elections

Judicial branch
The supreme courts are the Judicial revision court (Cour de révision judiciaire), which hears civil and criminal cases (as well as some administrative cases), and the Supreme tribunal (tribunal suprême), which performs judicial review. Both courts are staffed by French judges (appointed among judges of French courts, members of the Conseil d'État and university professors).

Political spectrum
Monegasque tend to be more conservative due to their alignment with the Catholic Church. There are no official left-wing parties although Union Monégasque is considered the "most liberal" of the three main parties that formed the Monegasque National Union. A new centre-left party, New Ideas for Monaco, was formed in 2022.

Administrative divisions
There are no first-order administrative divisions in the principality, which is instead traditionally divided into four quarters (French: quartiers, singular quartier): Fontvieille, La Condamine, Monaco-Ville and Monte-Carlo, with the suburb Moneghetti (part of La Condamine) colloquially seen as an unofficial, fifth quarter. They have a joint Communal Council of Monaco.

The principality is, for administrative and official purposes, currently divided into ten wards: 
Monaco-Ville
Monte Carlo/Spélugues
Fontvieille
Moneghetti/Bd de Belgique
Les Révoires
La Colle
La Condamine
Saint Michel
Larvotto/Bas Moulins
La Rousse/Saint Roman

International organization participation

ACCT, ECE, International Atomic Energy Agency, International Civil Aviation Organization, ICRM, IFRCS, IHO, IMO, Inmarsat, Intelsat, Interpol, International Olympic Committee, ITU, OPCW, OSCE, United Nations, UNCTAD, UNESCO, Universal Postal Union, World Health Organization, World Intellectual Property Organization, World Meteorological Organization, Council of Europe.

External links
 A summary of the principality's constitution